Kristjan Kõljalg (born 26 December 1982 in Paide) is an Estonian politician. He was a member of XIII Riigikogu.

References

Living people
1982 births
Estonian Reform Party politicians
Members of the Riigikogu, 2015–2019
University of Tartu alumni
People from Paide